Muḥammad Abū’l-Qāsim Ibn Ḥawqal, also known as  Abū al-Qāsim b. ʻAlī Ibn Ḥawqal al-Naṣībī,  born in Nisibis, Upper Mesopotamia; was a 10th-century Arab Muslim writer, geographer, and chronicler who travelled during the years 943 to 969 AD. His famous work, written in 977 AD, is called  ("The face of the Earth"). The date of his death, known from his writings, was after 368 AH/978 AD.

Biography 
Details known of Ibn Hawqal's life are extrapolated from his book.  He spent the last 30 years of his life traveling to remote parts of Asia and Africa and writing about what he saw. One journey brought him 20° south of the equator along the East African coast where he discovered large populations in regions the ancient Greek writers had deemed, from logic rather than knowledge, were uninhabitable.

Ṣūrat al-’Arḍ
Ibn Hawqal based his great work of geography on a revision and augmentation of the text called Masālik ul-Mamālik by Istakhri (951 AD), which itself was a revised edition of the Ṣuwar al-aqālīm by Ahmed ibn Sahl al-Balkhi, (ca. 921 AD).  However Ibn Hawqal was more than an editor, he was travel writer writing in the style followed later by Abu Ubaydallah al-Bakri in his Kitab al-Masālik wa-al-Mamālik, a literary genre which uses reports of merchants and travellers. Ibn Hawqal introduces 10th century humour into his account of Sicily during the Kalbid-Fatimid dynasty. As a primary source his medieval geography tends to exaggeration and his depiction of the barbaric uncivilised Christians of Palermo, reflects the prevailing politics of his time.  Yet his geographic accounts of his personal travels were relied upon, and found useful, by medieval Arab travellers.

The chapters on Al-Andalus, in Muslim-held Spain, and particularly on Sicily, describe the richly cultivated area of Fraxinet (La Garde-Freinet), and detail a number of regional innovations practiced by Muslim farmers and fishermen.
The chapter on the Byzantine Empire—known in the Muslim world as, and called by the Byzantines themselves, the "Lands of the Romans"—gives his first-hand observation of the 360 languages spoken in the Caucasus, with the Lingua Franca being Arabic and Persian across the region.  With the description of Kiev, he may have mentioned the route of the Volga Bulgars and the Khazars, which was perhaps taken from Sviatoslav I of Kiev. He also published a cartographic map of Sindh together with accounts of the geography and culture of Sindh and the Indus River.

Editions
An anonymous epitome of the book was written in 1233 AD.

In the 1870s, the famous Dutch orientalist Michael Jan de Goeje edited a selection of manuscript texts by Arab geographers, which was published by Brill, Leiden in the eight-volume series  Bibliotheca geographorum Arabicorum. Ibn Haukal's text was the second volume published in 1873 under the Latin title Viae et Regna, descriptio ditionis Moslemicae auctore Abu'l-Kásim Ibn Haukal - "Routes and Realms, a description of Muslim territories by the author Abu'l-Kásim Ibn Haukal".

See also
Istakhri
Al-Maqdisi
Ibn al-Faqih
Qudama ibn Ja'far
Ibn Khordadbeh
Ibn Rustah
Al-Ya'qubi
Al-Masudi
 Muslim scholars

References

Further reading
 James, Preston Everett. All Possible Worlds: A History of Geography. New York: Wiley, 1981.

External links
 
 

Year of birth unknown
Year of death unknown
10th-century geographers
10th-century people from the Abbasid Caliphate
10th-century writers
10th-century Arabs
Balkhi school
Travel writers of the medieval Islamic world
Writers from Baghdad
10th-century travelers
10th-century cartographers